Sarasinia punctata is a species of harvestmen in a monotypic genus in the family Sclerosomatidae from Celebes.

References

Harvestmen
Monotypic arthropod genera